Cortinarius cucumeris is a basidiomycete fungus of the genus Cortinarius native to New Zealand, where it grows under Nothofagus.

Austrian mycologist Egon Horak described the species in 1990. Within the genus it is classified in the subgenus Myxacium. The species name is the Latin genitive of cucumis, hence "of the cucumber".

They are conical when young before spreading out to convex and more flat in shape, but maintaining a central nipple-like bump. The crowded gills are adnate or adnexed early and adnate or free later. Initially lilac, they become silvery and then brown as the spores mature. The mushroom has a strong (and unpleasant) smell and taste of cucumber, though can resemble fish in old decaying specimens. The spore print is rusty brown and the warty oval spores measure 9.5–12 by 5.5–6 μm. The cap either doesn't stain or stains a yellow brown when potassium hydroxide is applied to it.

Cortinarius cucumeris has been recorded on both North and South Island in New Zealand. Fruit bodies appear from December to June under red beech (Nothofagus fusca) and silver beech (Nothofagus menziesii).

See also

List of Cortinarius species

References

External links

cucumeris
Fungi of New Zealand
Fungi described in 1990
Taxa named by Egon Horak